Sir Stephen Lushington, 1st Baronet (17 June 1744 – 12 January 1807), of South Hill Park in Easthampstead, Berkshire, was an English Member of Parliament and Chairman of the East India Company.

Life
Lushington was the third son of the Reverend Henry Lushington, vicar of Eastbourne.

From 1782 he was a director of the East India Company, and supported the reforms of the company being proposed by Charles James Fox; these would have brought the company under the control of a board of commissioners appointed by Parliament, and it was intended that Lushington should be one of the assistant commissioners. In 1783, as Fox prepared to introduce his India Bill in the House of Commons, Christopher Atkinson, one of the MPs for Hedon in Yorkshire, was convicted of fraud and would therefore be expelled from the House. Hedon was a rotten borough where the Foxites could expect their candidate to be elected, and Lushington's name was put forward by Prime Minister Portland to fill the vacancy.

Atkinson was formally expelled from the Commons on 4 December 1783, and a writ for the by-election was issued. However, the following day the Commons amended the East India Bill to make the assistant commissioners ineligible to sit in Parliament. This forced Lushington to choose between an assistant commissionership and a seat in Parliament and, knowing that the majority of the East India directors opposed Fox's bill he decided the latter was preferable. On 15 December he was elected unopposed for Hedon, but on the same day the House of Lords unexpectedly defeated Fox's India bill and the government fell.

Lushington spoke in opposition to the East India bill proposed by the new government under Pitt the Younger, which placed control of the Company in the hands of a board appointed by the Crown rather than by Parliament. In the general election of 1784 he was a candidate at Hastings, rather than defending his seat at Hedon, but was defeated.

He was deputy chairman of the East India Company in 1789–1790, and its chairman for three terms - 1790–1791, 1795–1796 and 1799–1800. He was created a baronet on 26 April 1791.

He returned to Parliament in 1790 as member for Helston, and was an MP for the rest of his life, subsequently also representing Mitchell, Penryn and Plympton Erle.

Family

In 1771 Lushington married Hester Boldero (d. 1830), whose father John settled the manors of Aspenden and Berkesdon in Hertfordshire on the couple. The family were based at South Hill Park near Bracknell in Berkshire from 1787 to 1807.

Their children included:
 Sir Henry Lushington (1775–1863), who succeeded to the baronetcy
 Sophia Lushington m. Denzil Onslow
 Stephen Lushington (1782–1873), a Member of Parliament and later a judge
 Charles Lushington (1785–1866), secretary to the government of Bengal and later also an MP
 Hester Lushington.

References

 

 Lewis Namier & John Brooke, The History of Parliament: The House of Commons 1754-1790 (London: HMSO, 1964)
 Dictionary of National Biography
 Hertfordshire genealogy

|-

1744 births
1807 deaths
British MPs 1780–1784
British MPs 1790–1796
British MPs 1796–1800
Lushington, Stephen, 1st Baronet
Members of the Parliament of Great Britain for Mitchell
Members of the Parliament of Great Britain for English constituencies
Members of the Parliament of the United Kingdom for Plympton Erle
People from Bracknell
Whig (British political party) MPs for English constituencies
UK MPs 1801–1802
UK MPs 1802–1806
UK MPs 1806–1807
Members of the Parliament of the United Kingdom for Mitchell
Members of the Parliament of the United Kingdom for Penryn